Starwatch Entertainment is a German music label founded by ProSiebenSat.1 Media in spring 2005. The company has headquarters is in Unterföhring, near Munich. The company has expanded its operations from label activities to music cooperation, live-entertainment business, artist management and ticketing. The ticketing platform Tickethall.de is a subsidiary of Starwatch Entertainment.

Starwatch Entertainment has both a completely independent music label (Starwatch Entertainment) as well as partner-labels with different partners throughout the music industry: Sony Music (SevenOne Music), Warner Music (Starwatch Music), Universal Music (We Love Music), Embassy of Music (Embassy of Sound & Media)

Selected artists signed

 Mandy Capristo
 Passenger
 Alanis Morissette
 Lenny Kravitz
 Lena
 Marit Larsen
 Stanfour
 Medina
 A-ha
 Morten Harket
 Nena
 Scorpions
 Joe Cocker
 Roger Cicero
 Kim Wilde
 Adya
 Chris de Burgh
 Udo Lindenberg
 Max Herre
 Annett Louisan
 Peter Maffay
 Aloe Blacc
 Boyzone
 Ivy Quainoo
 Tokio Hotel
 Exit Eden

References

External links 
  

Warner Music labels
ProSiebenSat.1 Media